"Don't Wanna Be the One" is a song by Australian rock band Midnight Oil, released in October 1981 as the lead single from the band's third studio album, Place without a Postcard. The song peaked at no. 40 in Australia.

Track listing
 "Don't Wanna Be the One"  - 3:04
 "Written in the Heart" - 5:54

Charts

References 

1981 singles
Midnight Oil songs
Songs written by Rob Hirst
Songs written by Jim Moginie
Songs written by Peter Garrett
Songs written by Martin Rotsey
Columbia Records singles
Song recordings produced by Glyn Johns
1981 songs